A.D. Oliver Middle School is located in Brockport, Monroe County, New York. It was built in 1934, and is a three-story, English Tudor Revival style reinforced concrete and brick building with three sections. It has molded bricks and terra cotta decorative elements and Indiana limestone trim. Attached to the original building is a 1956 gymnasium addition and an addition built in 1996.  The building housed the Brockport Central Rural High School until 1967, when Brockport High School was constructed, and since then has been used as a middle school. It serves grades 6th, 7th and 8th. Mr. Jerrod D. Roberts is currently the principal. Mrs. Michelle Guerrieri and Mr. Matthew Hennard are the assistant principals. 
The school was listed on the National Register of Historic Places in 2011.

References

External links

Brockport, New York
Public high schools in New York (state)
School buildings on the National Register of Historic Places in New York (state)
Tudor Revival architecture in New York (state)
School buildings completed in 1934
Buildings and structures in Monroe County, New York
National Register of Historic Places in Monroe County, New York
1934 establishments in New York (state)